L'Atroce Volupté is a drama in two acts by Georges Neveux and Max Maurey, premiered at the Théâtre des Deux-Masques in Paris on 14 March 1919.

Characters 
Djana, headmistress
de Sombreuse, her husband
Robert, Djana's lover
Jeanne, housemaid
The nurse
Doctor Brémond
Professor Ternier

Sources 
 Agnès Pierron, Grand Guignol, le théâtre des peurs de la Belle Époque, éd. Robert Laffont

French plays
1919 plays